The Ukrainian Weekly is the oldest English-language newspaper of the Ukrainian diaspora in the United States, and North America.

Founded by the Ukrainian National Association, and published continuously since October 6, 1933, archived copies of the newspaper are available at leading libraries in the United States, as well as online at the newspaper's website.

References 

Weekly newspapers published in the United States
Ukrainian-American history
Newspapers published in New Jersey
Ukrainian National Association
Ethnic press in the United States